Another Time, Another Place was Bryan Ferry's second studio album as a solo artist. The album reached #4 in the UK charts in 1974.

Recording took place in London at Island, Ramport and AIR studios. Like These Foolish Things, Another Time, Another Place is essentially a cover album, with the exception of the last song, which gave its title to the album and was written by Ferry. It featured a Bob Dylan song ("A Hard Rain's a-Gonna Fall" on the former LP, "It Ain't Me Babe" on the latter) and a standard (the title track of These Foolish Things, "Smoke Gets in Your Eyes" on Another Time, Another Place) but while These Foolish Things emphasized an early-'60s girl-group repertoire, Another Time, Another Place turned to soul music (Sam Cooke, Ike & Tina Turner) and country music (Kris Kristofferson, Willie Nelson, Joe South).

Critical reception
Reviewing for AllMusic, critic Ned Raggett wrote of the album "The album as a whole feels a touch more formal than its predecessor, but Ferry and company, plus various brass and string sections, turn on the showiness enough to make it all fun. A harbringer of solo albums to come appears at end -- the title track, a Ferry original." And the critic Robert Christgau wrote of the album "Comedy routines are rarely as funny the second time around, especially when you've used up your best lines--"The `In' Crowd" is the only zinger Ferry comes up with here."

Track listing
Side 1
{{Track listing|
| title1 = The 'In' Crowd
| note1 = Dobie Gray cover from the album ''Dobie Gray Sings for 'In' Crowders That 'Go Go (1965)
| writer1 = Billy Page
| length1 = 4:36
| title2 = Smoke Gets in Your Eyes
| note2 = cover
| writer2 = Jerome Kern, Otto Harbach
| length2 = 2:53
| title3 = Walk a Mile in My Shoes
| note3 = cover
| writer3 = Joe South
| length3 = 4:44
| title4 = Funny How Time Slips Away
| note4 = Billy Walker cover
| writer4 = Willie Nelson
| length4 = 3:31
| title5 = You Are My Sunshine
| note5 = cover
| writer5 = Jimmie Davis, Charles Mitchell
| length5 = 6:47
| all_writing = 
| title6 = 
| length6 = 
| title7 = 
| length7 = 
| title8 = 
| length8 = 
| title9 = 
| length9 = 
| title10 = 
| length10 = 
| total_length = 
}}

Side 2

Charts

 Personnel Soloists: Bryan Ferry – lead vocals, keyboards, organ, harmonica
 David O'List – guitars
 John Porter – guitars
 John Wetton – bass, fiddle
 Paul Thompson – drums
 Ruan O'Lochlainn – alto saxophone 
 Chris Mercer – tenor saxophone 
 Chris Pyne – trombone 
 Henry Lowther – trumpetAlso featuring:''' (instruments are mentioned tentatively based on the credits of other Bryan Ferry records):
 J. Peter Robinson – keyboards
 Mark Warner – guitars
 John Punter – bass
 Tony Carr – drums, percussion 
 Tony Charles – drums
 Bruce Rowland – drums
 Morris Pert – percussion
 Jimmy Hastings – flute
 Jeff Daly – saxophones
 Bob Efford – saxophones
 Ronnie Ross – saxophones
 Alan Skidmore – saxophones
 Winston Stone – saxophones 
 Malcolm Griffiths – trombone
 Steve Saunders – trombone 
 Paul Cosh – trumpet
 Martin Drover – trumpet
 Alf Reece – tuba
 Ann Odell – string arrangements 
 Martyn Ford – brass arrangements
 Vicki Brown –  backing vocals 
 Helen Chappelle – backing vocals 
 Don Cirilo – backing vocals 
 Barry St. John – backing vocals 
 Liza Strike – backing vocals

Production 
 Bryan Ferry – producer, cover concept 
 John Punter – producer, engineer 
 Rhett Davies – assistant engineer 
 Mark Dodson – assistant engineer 
 Gary Edwards – assistant engineer 
 Sean Milligan – assistant engineer 
 Eric Boman – photography 
 Nicholas de Ville – design 
 Bob Bowkett (C.C.S.) – artwork 
 Antony Price – fashion
 Simon Puxley – media consultant

References

External links
RoxyRama.com entry
British certification

1974 albums
Bryan Ferry albums
Albums produced by John Punter
Covers albums
Island Records albums
Albums recorded at AIR Studios